Platyctenida is an order of comb jellies.

Taxonomy 
Platyctenida is the only benthic group of organisms in the phylum Ctenophora. Platyctenida are considered to be a phylogenetically young group along with the orders Lobata and Beroida and are believed to have stemmed from an ancestral version of the order Cydippida, after some kind of bottleneck effect in the phylum. This has been supported by strong morphological and developmental data, specifically the sharing of what has been termed a "Cydippida-like" larva form in all 4 orders. Platyctenida is thought to be a polyphyletic group.

Description 
Ranging in size 15 cm and below, they have dorsalventrally flattened, oval bodies and secondarily bilaterally symmetrical, platyctenids look very much like nudibranchs or flatworms and are often confused for them. All but 1 species of platyctenids do not possess the iconic ctene rows (the ciliated comb-rows) that distinguishes the Ctenophores but they still possess the pair of tentilla-bearing tentacles and adhesive collocytes that also characterize the phylum in pores along the dorsal surface. They cling to and creep on surfaces by everting the pharynx and using it as a muscular "foot".

They are usually cryptically-colored, live on rocks, algae, soft coral, or the body surfaces of other invertebrates; primarily certain species of Cnidarians and Echinoderms (primarily the genus Coeloplana sp.). They are often revealed by their long tentacles with many sidebranches, seen streaming off the back of the animal into the current. They tend to be ectosymbiotic with the organisms they live on.

Whereas most Ctenophores are hermaphroditic, certain platyctenids have been found to be asexual, and furthermore, where other Ctenophores have been found to reproduce using external fertilization, certain species of platyctenids have been found to use brood pouches.

References

1)Rudman, W. B. 1999. Benthic ctenophores. Sea Slug Forum, Australian Museum, Sydney

2)Eeckhaut, I., Flammang, P., Lo Bue, C., & Jangoux, M. 1997. Functional morphology of the tentacles and tentilla of Coeloplana bannworthi (ctenophore, platyctenida), an ectosymbiont of Diadema setosum (echinodermata, echinoida). Zoomorphology, 117:165-174.

3)Harbison, G. R. 2001. Ctenophora. Encyclopaedia of Life Sciences

4)Podar, M., Haddock, S., Sogin, M., & Harbison, R. 2001. A Molecular Phylogenetic Framework for the Phylum Ctenophora using 18S rRNA Genes. Molecular Phylogenetics and Evolution. Vol: 21 (2), 218-230

Tentaculata